Elama Faʻatonu (born 30 April 1994) is an American Samoan sprinter. He competed in the 100 metres event at the 2012 Summer Olympics in London. He ranked 7th in his qualifying heat and failed to advance though he set a personal best time of 11.48 seconds.

Football career 
Fa'atonu played besides semi-professional as a striker for the FFAS Senior League club Utulei Youth, as well for the American Samoa national under-17 football team.

References

External links
 

1994 births
Living people
American people of Samoan descent
American Samoan male sprinters
Olympic track and field athletes of American Samoa
Athletes (track and field) at the 2012 Summer Olympics
American Samoan footballers
Association football forwards
People from Faga'alu
American Samoa youth international footballers